Daniela Graglia (born 26 May 1976 in Fossano) is a former Italian sprinter and middle distance runner.

Biography
Daniela Graglia participated at one edition of the Summer Olympics (2000), she has 24 caps in national team from 2000 to 2008.

Achievements

National titles
Daniela Graglia has won 11 times the individual national championship.
1 win on 100 metres (2003)
3 wins on 200 metres (2000, 2003, 2006)
2 wins on 400 metres (2001, 2002)
2 wins on 60 metres indoor (2005, 2007)
3 wins on 200 metres indoor (2000, 2001, 2005)

See also
 Italy national relay team
 Italian all-time lists - 200 metres
 Italian all-time lists - 4x100 metres relay

References

External links
 

1976 births
People from Fossano
Italian female sprinters
Athletes (track and field) at the 2000 Summer Olympics
Olympic athletes of Italy
Living people
Olympic female sprinters
Sportspeople from the Province of Cuneo